María Turgenova (1900–1972) was a Spanish actress, singer and vedette, as well as an Argentine silent film star. She was born in Spain and died in 
Buenos Aires, Argentina.

Filmography
 1925: El organito de la tarde 
 1926: La costurerita que dio aquel mal paso 
 1926: Muchachita de Chiclana
 1927: Perdón, viejita 
 1930: El cantar de mi ciudad 
 1930: La canción del gaucho 
 1931: Muñequitas porteñas

External links
 
 María Turgenova at Buenos Aires Ministerio de Cultura

1900 births
1972 deaths
Argentine vedettes
Spanish expatriates in Argentina